The Ivor Novello Awards are held annually since 1956 by the Ivors Academy, formerly the British Academy of Songwriters, Composers and Authors, to recognize the excellence in songwriting and composing. The following list consists of all the winners and nominees of the awards by year, the winners are listed first and in bold followed by the nominees if present.

The awards and/or nominations are received by the songwriters of the nominated work, not the performers, unless they also have songwriting credits.

2010s
2010

The 55th Ivor Novello Awards were presented on May 20, 2010 at the Grosvenor House, London.

2011

The 56th Ivor Novello Awards were presented on May 19, 2011 at the Grosvenor House, London.

2012

The 57th Ivor Novello Awards were presented on May 17, 2012 at the Grosvenor House, London.

2013

The 59th Ivor Novello Awards were presented on May 13, 2013 at the Grosvenor House, London.

2014

The 59th Ivor Novello Awards were presented on May 22, 2014 at the Grosvenor House, London.

2015

The 60th Ivor Novello Awards were presented on May 21, 2015 at the Grosvenor House, London.

2016

The 61st Ivor Novello Awards took place on May 19, 2016 at the Grosvenor House, Park Lane, London.

2017

The 62nd Ivor Novello Awards were presented on May 18, 2017 at the Grosvenor House, Park Lane, London.

2018

The 63rd Ivor Novello Awards were presented on May 31, 2018 at the Grosvenor House, Park Lane, London.

2019

The 64th Ivors Novello Awards were presented on May 23, 2019 at the Grosvenor House, Park Lane, London.

2020s
2020

The 65th Ivors took place on September 2, 2020 on Apple Music 1 hosted by Matt Wilkinson.

2021

The winners for the 66th Ivor Novello Awards were announced on September 21, 2021.

2022

The winners for the 67th Ivor Novello Awards were announced on May 19, 2022 in a ceremony at the Grosvenor House in London.

References

External links

 Ivor Awards archive